Jorge Gonçalves Tavares (21 January 1905 – 1951) was a Portuguese footballer who played as a forward.

Club career
Tavares joined S.L. Benfica at the age of 19. He made his official debut on 19 October 1924, against C.F. Os Belenenses.

Used mainly as a centre forward, Tavares was consistently was one of the Lisbon team's top scorers, ranking first in the 1924–25 and 1925–26 seasons. He helped the club conquer its first national titles, the 1930 and 1931 Campeonato de Portugal, and retired on 26 January 1932 at the age of 27.

International career
Tavares gained three caps for Portugal in nearly three years, his first coming on 18 April 1926 in a 2–4 friendly loss to France. He was an unused squad member at the 1928 Football Olympic tournament.

References
General
 

Specific

External links

1905 births
1951 deaths
Portuguese footballers
Association football forwards
Primeira Liga players
S.L. Benfica footballers
Portugal international footballers
Footballers at the 1928 Summer Olympics
Olympic footballers of Portugal